Sơn Ngọc Minh (1920 – 22 December 1972), also known as Achar Mean, was a Cambodian achar and communist politician whose first notable career achievement was in 1950 when he was appointed the head of provisional revolutionary government of the United Issarak Front organised at Hồng Dân. Among his Vietnamese friends, he was known as Phạm Văn Hua.

Biography

Son Ngoc Minh was born in 1920 at Trà Vinh Province (present-day Vietnam) during the French colonial period to an ethnic Khmer father and a Vietnamese mother. He became a Buddhist lay preacher (Achar). During the Indochina War, he was recruited by Vietnamese communists (Viet Minh) to serve as President of a newly formed Cambodian People's Liberation Committee (CPLC) in Battambang. Minh had been born in a Khmer district of southern Vietnam of mixed Khmer-Vietnamese parentage, which meant he was the nearest the Vietnamese had to an authentic Khmer revolutionary. His nom de guerre was intended to capitalise on the popularity of Sihanouk's banished rival, Son Ngoc Thanh, then still languishing in exile in France.

Son Ngoc Minh was the leader of the first nationwide congress of the leftist Khmer Issarak groups, which founded the United Issarak Front. In 1950, he formally declared Cambodia's independence after claiming that the UIF controlled one third of the country. Along with Tou Samouth, Minh founded the Kampuchean People's Revolutionary Party (KPRP) in 1951. After the Geneva Agreements and the end of the First Indochina war, Son Ngoc Minh and many Khmer Issarak officials left Cambodia for North Vietnam.

Minh remained a senior figure in the Party, albeit largely operating from Hanoi in North Vietnam, until 1972, when at the request of Ieng Sary he was sent to hospital in Beijing to be treated for high blood pressure. Minh died in Beijing on 22 December. His death further lessened the influence of the Hanoi-trained communists on the Khmer Rouge, correspondingly increasing the power of the hardline Party 'Centre' led by Pol Pot.

References

Bibliography

 Dommen, Arthur J.; The Indochinese Experience of the French and the Americans: Nationalism and Communism in Cambodia, Laos, and Vietnam, Indiana University Press, 2001, 
 Tyner, James A.; The Killing of Cambodia: Geography, Genocide and the Unmaking of Space, Ashgate Publishing, Ltd., 2008

1920 births
1972 deaths
Cambodian people of Vietnamese descent
Communist Party of Kampuchea politicians
Khmer Krom people
People from Trà Vinh province
Cambodian communists
Cambodian expatriates in Vietnam